Călinești or Călineștii may refer to several places in Romania:

 Călinești, Argeș, a commune in Argeș County
 Călinești, Maramureș, a commune in Maramureș County
 Călinești, Teleorman, a commune in Teleorman County
 Călinești, a village in Negri Commune, Bacău County
 Călinești, a village in Cândești Commune, Botoșani County
 Călinești, a village in Mischii Commune, Dolj County
 Călinești, a village in Radomirești Commune, Olt County
 Călinești, a village in Florești Commune, Prahova County
 Călinești and Călinești-Vasilache, villages in Dărmănești Commune, Suceava County
 Călinești, a village in Șerbăuți Commune, Suceava County
 Călinești, a district in Bucecea Town, Botoșani County
 Călinești, a district in Brezoi Town, Vâlcea County
 Călinești-Oaș, a commune in Satu Mare County
 Călineștii de Jos and Călineștii de Sus, villages in Bâlvănești Commune, Mehedinți County

rivers in Romania:
 Călinești, a tributary of the Bistrița in Suceava County
 Călinești (Olt), a tributary of the Olt in Vâlcea County

and to:

 Călinești, Fălești, a commune in Fălești district, Moldova

See also 
 Călin (given name)
 Călinescu (surname)